In March 2023, a series of atmospheric rivers hit California, breaching levees across the state, melting the snowpack and causing at least two deaths. Multiple atmospheric rivers between  December 31, 2022, and January 25, 2023, had already resulted in extensive flooding throughout the state.

Effects

Northern California

San Francisco Bay Area
The Trocadero in San Francisco was severely damaged as a result of the storm. Flooding shut down US 101 in Gilroy.

Central California

Pajaro River
On March 10, the levee on the Pajaro River failed, triggering flooding and forcing nearly 2,000 residents to evacuate. Another breach was discovered March 13, though authorities believed that breach may have helped ease flooding as it gave the river another outlet. Experts said the levees had been weakened by poor material selection, earthquakes and rodent activity.

Soquel
About 450 people were stranded in their homes in Soquel in Santa Cruz County after a creek washed out the only road leading to their neighborhood on March 10. A water main break also deprived residents of access to clean water.

Tulare County
In Tulare County, a levee on Deer Creek north of the historically Black town of Allensworth breached the night of March 17, forcing residents of Allensworth and nearby Alpaugh to evacuate. Officials said an individual had used machinery to deliberately breach the levee.

See also 
 List of United States flash flood emergencies

References

2023 floods in the United States
2023 meteorology
2023 in California
March 2023 events in the United States
2023